The Screen Actors Guild Life Achievement Award is presented by the Screen Actors Guild's National Honors and Tributes Committee for "outstanding achievement in fostering the finest ideals of the acting profession." It predates the 1st Screen Actors Guild Awards by over thirty years. The award's first recipient was performer and comedian Eddie Cantor, in 1962. Since then, it has been presented every year except 1963, 1981 and 2021. On two occasions, two people received the award the same year: in 1985, when it was presented to actor Paul Newman and actress Joanne Woodward, and in 2000, when it was presented to civil rights activists Ossie Davis and Ruby Dee. The award was not given in 2020 due to the COVID-19 pandemic. As of 2021, 59 people have received the award, of whom 39 are men and 20 women. Sally Field was announced as the recipient for the 2022 award.

Award recipients

References

 
 
Lifetime achievement awards